St. Leo's College, Kyegobe is a Catholic-based, government-aided residential boys' secondary school, located in Fort Portal, Kabarole District, in the Western Region of Uganda. The school offers both "O" and "A" level education.

Location
The coordinates of the school are 0°37'43.0"N, 30°17'10.0"E (Latitude:0.628622; Longitude:30.286115).

Overview
It was founded in 1921 by the Catholic White Fathers. The college was first established at what presently stands as St. Mary's Seminary in Virika, Fort Portal. By then, it was attracting pupils from St. Peter's Primary School and other Catholic primary schools. In the early 1930s, the White Fathers invited the Brothers of Christian Instruction to take over from them. In the early 1960s, the school was shifted to its current location, on a hill overlooking the plains of the Rwenzori Mountains and some parts of Fort Portal town.

Reputation
St. Leo's College was, at one time, among the most prestigious schools in Uganda because of its history, influence, excellent academic performance, and dominance in sports. More recently, it has fallen on hard times, with declining student grades, increased student hooliganism, recurrent student strikes, and financial shortfalls.

Academics
Subjects offered at "O" Level include biology, chemistry, Christian religious education, commerce, computer studies, English language and literature, fine art, French, geography, history, mathematics, and physics.

At "A" Level, the subjects offered are categorised into arts and sciences. The arts subjects offered are history, economics, divinity, French, literature in English, geography, computer studies, and fine art.
 
The science subjects offered are physics, chemistry, mathematics, biology, subsidiary mathematics, and general paper, which is compulsory.

Notable alumni
The following notable people are alumni of St. Leo's Kyegobe: (1) Crescent Baguma, (2) Venansius Baryamureeba, (3) Tress Bucyanayandi, (4) Tom Butime (5) John Byabagambi (6) Joseph Mulenga (8) Charles Onyango-Obbo and (9) Shaban Bantariza (10) Dr. Paul Kawanga Ssemogerere (11) Selestino Babungi (12) Herbert Kiiza  (13) Abaine Jonathan Bulegyeya (14) Dr. Silver Mugisha.

See also

 Education in Uganda
 List of boarding schools
 List of schools in Uganda
 Roman Catholicism in Uganda

References

External links
"St. Leo's Kyegobe expels 17"
"His chalk was diplomacy"
"St. Leo's College Kyegobe Closed "
"Obua falls from grace to grass "

1921 establishments in Uganda
Boarding schools in Uganda
Boys' schools in Uganda
Christian schools in Uganda
Educational institutions established in 1921
Kabarole District
Middle schools
Catholic boarding schools
Catholic Church in Uganda
Catholic secondary schools in Africa
White Fathers

Kumusha